This is a list of those who have served as Chancellor of County Durham:

1655–?: Thomas Widdrington
1787–1788: John Scott
1788–1791: Sir John Mitford
1791–1798: Sir Thomas Manners-Sutton
1798–1818: Samuel Romilly
1818–1835: Robert Hopper Williamson
1835–1846: Sir Charles Wetherell
1847–1851: Richard Torin Kindersley
1851–1871: Christopher Temple
1871–1887: James Fleming
1887–1892: Gainsford Bruce
1892–1905: Thomas Milvain
1905–1915: John Scott Fox
1915–1930: Edward Tindal Atkinson
1930–1936: Sir Henry Arthur Colefax
1936–1950: Charles Paley Scott
1950–1958: John Charlesworth
1958–1959: James Neville Gray
1959–1960: Arthur Geoffrey Neale Cross
1960–1969: Henry Edwin Salt
1969–1971: Hugh Elvet Francis

References

1595 Tobias Matthews

Source: Dedication of Barnabe Barnes (c. 1569 - 1609) of his Divine Centurie of Spirituall Sonnets to:

TO THE RIGHT REVERENDE FATHER IN GOD, the Right honourable and my very good Lorde, TOBIE (by the grace of God) Bishop and Counte Palatine of Duresme and Sadberge: Increase of all true zeale, honour & perpetuall consolation of mind and bodye.

https://quod.lib.umich.edu/e/eebo/A04549.0001.001/1:2?rgn=div1;view=fulltext

Chancellor